Bush River is a tidal estuary in Harford County, Maryland, located about 15 mi (24 km) northeast of Baltimore.  The estuary extends from the community of Riverside, south for about 9 mi (14 km), to the Chesapeake Bay. The watershed area of tidal Bush River is 125 mi2 (320 km2), and includes Aberdeen Proving Ground, a military facility.

Tributaries
Bush River has three principal tributaries: Bush Creek, Church Creek and Otter Point Creek. The smaller tributaries are:

 Abbey Creek
 Bear Cabin Branch
 Bread and Cheese Branch
 Broad Run
 Bynum Run
 Cod Creek
 Coopers Creek
 Cranberry Run
 Deep Spring Branch
 East Branch
 Elbow Brook
 Grays Run
 Haha Branch

 Heavenly Waters
 High Bridge Branch
 Hoops Branch
 James Run
 Kings Creek
 Lauderick Creek
 Long Branch
 Monks Creek
 Mountain Branch
 Plumtree Run
 Sod Run
 West Branch
 Winters Run

See also
List of Maryland rivers

References

 Harford County Department of Public Works. "Bush River Basin." Accessed 2009-09-03.
 United States Geological Survey. Reston, VA. "Bush River." Geographic Names Information System (GNIS). Accessed 2009-09-03.

Rivers of Harford County, Maryland
Tributaries of the Chesapeake Bay
Rivers of Maryland